This is a list of notable people from Kent County, New Brunswick. Although not everyone in this list was born in Kent County, they all live or have lived in Kent County and have had significant connections to the communities.

See also
List of people from New Brunswick

References

Kent